The 1973–74 season was Blackpool F.C.'s 66th season (63rd consecutive) in the Football League. They competed in the 22-team Division Two, then the second tier of English football, finishing fifth.

This was Harry Potts' first full season in charge.

Micky Burns was the club's top scorer, with seventeen goals (fourteen in the league and three in the League Cup).

Alan Suddick scored his 100th League goal, a penalty, in Blackpool's 3–0 victory over Preston North End at Bloomfield Road on 23 March 1974.

Table

Notes

References

Blackpool F.C.
Blackpool F.C. seasons